Aidos is a genus of moths of the Aididae family.

Species
 Aidos amanda
 Aidos osorius
 Aidos perfusa
 Aidos yamouna

References

Zygaenoidea genera
Zygaenoidea